Zanclognatha jacchusalis, the wavy-lined zanclognatha, is a litter moth of the family Erebidae. It was described by Francis Walker in 1859. It is found in the US from Wisconsin to Maine, south to Georgia and Louisiana.

Adults are on wing from April to September. Normally, there is one generation per year. There are two generations in Missouri.

Larvae probably feed on detritus. Larvae have been reared on dead oak leaves.

Subspecies
Zanclognatha jacchusalis jacchusalis
Zanclognatha jacchusalis bryanti Barnes, 1928
Zanclognatha jacchusalis lutalba (Smith, 1906)

External links
Images
BugGuide

jacchusalis
Moths of North America
Taxa named by Francis Walker (entomologist)
Moths described in 1859